Ticonata or Tikonata (possibly from Aymara tikuna a kind of worm or caterpillar, -ta a suffix, "from") is an island on the Peruvian side of Lake Titicaca. It is located in the Puno Region, Puno Province, Capachica District, between the peninsula Capachica in the east and the island Amantani in the west.

Sources 

Lake islands of Peru
Islands of Lake Titicaca
Landforms of Puno Region